The 2014 Central American and Caribbean Games football tournament is scheduled to be the 20th edition of the competition at the 21st edition of the Central American and Caribbean Games. It will be the first CAC Games football competition to take since 2006 due to the cancellation of the 2010 edition.

Although the competition is considered to be an under-21 age group competition, up to three players born before 1 January 1993 may be named in the squad. Each participating national football association will select a final squad of 20 players.

The women's tournament was won by Mexico over Colombia.

The men's tournament was won by Mexico as well, over Venezuela. This is the 6th gold medal in this competition for the Mexican side. The last time they accomplished the gold medal was over 20 years ago.

Men's event

Squads

Participants

Venues

Group stage 

Each team will play one game against each of the teams in their group in a round-robin format.  Teams will be awarded three points for a win, one for a tie and no points for a loss.

Teams that finish in 1st and 2nd position will advance to the semi-final round.

Tie-breaking criteria
Teams were ranked on the following criteria:

 1. Greater number of points in all group matches
 2. Goal difference in all group matches
 3. Greater number of goals scored in all group matches

The group stage draw was conducted on 9 October 2014.

Group A

Group B

Knockout stage

Semi-finals

Bronze-medal match

Gold-medal match

Statistics

Goalscorers

Women's event

Squads

Group stage 

Each team will play one game against each of the teams in their group in a round-robin format.  Teams will be awarded three points for a win, one for a tie and no points for a loss.

Teams that finish in 1st and 2nd position will advance to the semi-final round.

Tie-breaking criteria
Teams were ranked on the following criteria:

 1. Greater number of points in all group matches
 2. Goal difference in all group matches
 3. Greater number of goals scored in all group matches

The group stage draw was conducted on 9 October 2014.

Group A

Group B

Knockout stage

Semi-finals

Bronze-medal match

Gold-medal match

Statistics

Goalscorers

References

External links
Central America and Caribbean Games Women's Football 2014 on Women's Soccer United 
Mexico win Central America & Caribbean Games 2014

 
2014
Football
Central
2014
2014–15 in Mexican football
2014–15 in Honduran football
2014–15 in Costa Rican football
2014–15 in Salvadoran football
2014–15 in Venezuelan football
2014–15 in Nicaraguan football
2014 in Colombian football
2014 in women's association football
2014–15 in Jamaican football